Thalmann is a surname of:

 Alexander E. Thalmann (1992-2014), American police officer
  (1919–1975), German politician (LDPD)
 Carmen Thalmann (born 1989), Austrian female alpine skier
 Clara Thalmann, née Enser (1910–1987), Swiss female anarchist
 Dionysius "Dionys" Thalmann (born 1953), Swiss sprint canoeist
 Edward D. Thalmann (1945–2004), American Naval officer and hyperbaric medicine specialist who developed algorithms for deep-sea diving
 Ernst Thälmann (1886–1944), German communist politician
 Gaëlle Thalmann (born 1986), Swiss footballer
  (born 1963), German motocross racer
  (born 1953), German musician, musicologist and journalist
 Kerry L. Thalmann, American landscape photographer
  (1890–1944), German painter, woodcarver, graphic artist, illustrator and book artist
 Paul Thalmann (anarchist) (1901–1980), Swiss author, editor, resistant, communist and anarchist
 Paul Thalmann (footballer) (born 1884), Swiss footballer
  (1915–2002), Swiss Catholic theologian and priest
 Sophie Thalmann (born 1976), French model, Miss France (1998)

Other 
 Ladenburg Thalmann Financial Services, NYSE Amex-listed company (LTS), a diversified financial services company
 Thalmann algorithm (VVAL 18), a decompression model originally designed for the U.S. Navy, in wide use by military and civilian dive computers
 Thalmann Mountains, group of mountains in the Muhlig-Hofmann Mountains

See also 
 Thalman
 Thälmann

German-language surnames
Jewish surnames